Rochester Lancers may refer to:
 Rochester Lancers (2015), a semi-professional soccer team that competes in the National Premier Soccer League
 Rochester Lancers (MASL), an indoor soccer team that competes in the Major Arena Soccer League 2
 Rochester Lady Lancers, a women's soccer team that competes in the United Women's Soccer League since 2017
 Rochester Lancers (1967–1980), a defunct soccer team that played in the American Soccer League (1967–1969) and the North American Soccer League (1970–1980)